The International School and Conference on Network Science, also called NetSci, is an annual conference focusing on networks. It is organized yearly since 2006 by the Network Science Society. Physicists are especially prominently represented among the participants, though people from other backgrounds attend as well. The study of networks expanded at the end of the twentieth century, with increasing citation of some seminal papers.

Following this increase in interest from the scientific community, network science was examined by the National Research Council (NRC), the arm of the US National Academies in charge of offering policy recommendations to the US government. NRC assembled two panels, resulting in recommendations summarized in two NRC Reports, offering a definition of the field of network science. These reports not only documented the emergence of a new research field, but highlighted the field’s role for science, national competitiveness and security. The NetSci conference series was set up in 2006 to address the need of the new and emerging highly interdisciplinary network science community to meet and exchange ideas. The NetSci conference has been a yearly event since then. In 2015,  a shorter regional conference, called NetSci-X, was added.

History

The formal NetSci conference series was preceded by several meetings: 
 RESEARCH WORKSHOP ON GRAPH THEORY AND STATISTICAL PHYSICS, ICTP Trieste May 22–25 (2000)
 XVIII Sitges Conference (2002)
 COSIN Project Midterm Conference (2003)
 CNLS Annual Conference 2003: Networks, Structure, Dynamics and Function, May 12–26,  Santa Fe, New Mexico. Organized by Zoltán Toroczkai, Eli Ben-Naim, Hans Frauenfelder, Pieter Swart, supported by Los Alamos National Laboratory.
 Aveiro Conference CNET 2004 August 29–September 2 (2004)
 School and Workshop on Structure and Function of Complex Networks, ICTP Trieste May 16–28 (2005)

In 2006 these events became part of an organized structure with one network conference per year.

 NetSci 2006 May 16–25, Indiana University Bloomington, USA. Organized by Albert-László Barabási, Katy Börner, Noshir Contractor, Alessandro Vespignani and Stanley Wasserman.
 NetSci 2007 May 20–25, New York Hall of Science, USA
 NetSci 2008 June 23–27, Norwich University, UK 
 NetSci 2009 June 29-July 3, INFM, Istituto Veneto, Venice, ITALY. Organized by Guido Caldarelli and Vittoria Colizza.
 NetSci 2010 May 10–14, Northeastern University/MIT Boston, USA
 NetSci 2011 June 1–6, Hungarian Academy of Science, Budapest, HUNGARY
 NetSci 2012 June 18–22 Northwestern University, Evanston, USA
 NetSci 2013 June 3–7, Royal Library, Technical University of Denmark, Copenhagen, Denmark. Organized by Petter Holme and Sune Lehmann (general chairs)
 NetSci 2014 June 2–6, University of California, Berkeley, USA. Organized by Raissa D'Souza and Neo Martinez.
 NetSci 2015 June 1–5, University of Zaragoza, SPAIN
 NetSci 2016 May 30–June 3, Korean Academy of Science, Seoul, Korea. Organized by Hawoong Jeong (general chair), Guanrong Chen (co-chair), and Reka Albert (co-chair).
 NetSci 2017 June 19–23, held in Indianapolis, USA, and organized by the Indiana University Network Science Institute, with Olaf Sporns and Filippo Menczer as general co-chairs. The 2017 conference was the largest yet, with 680 registrations from 29 countries. The event featured three keynote speakers, 10 plenary speakers, 22 pre-conference satellite workshops and 23 technical sessions with about 130 oral presentations and 218 posters.
 NetSci 2018 June 1–15, 2018, Paris, France Organised by A. Barrat and Vittoria Colizza
 NetSci 2019 May 27–31, 2019, Vermont, USA
 NetSci 2020 ONLINE September 17–25 (before COVID-19 pandemic was originally planned for July 6–10), Rome, Italy Organised by Guido Caldarelli, Giulio Cimini, Tommaso Gili, Andrea Nicolai
 Networks 2021 (joint Sunbelt and NetSci conference) ONLINE July 5–10
 NetSci 2022 July 25–29, Shanghai, China
 NetSci 2023 July 10–14, Vienna, Austria

In 2015, the Network Science Society added an additional, shorter regional conference, called NetSci-X, held in January:
 
 NetSci-X 2015 January 14–16, Rio de Janeiro, Brazil, Organized by Prof. Ronaldo Menezes of University of Exeter, Dr. Alexandre Evsukoff of FGV, and Dr. Nelson Ebecken of COPPE/UFRJ.
 NetSci-X 2016 January 11–13, Wrocław, Poland, Organized by Dr. Przemyslaw Kazienko of Wrocław University of Science and Technology and Dr. Boleslaw Szymanski of Rensselaer Polytechnic Institute
 NetSci-X 2017 January 15–18, Tel-Aviv, Israel, Organized by Dr. Erez Shmueli of Tel-Aviv University and Dr. Baruch Barzel of Bar-Ilan University.
 NetSci-X 2018 January 5–8, Hangzhou, China
 NetSci-X 2019 January 3–5, Santiago, Chile
 NetSci-X 2020 January 20–23, Tokyo, Japan
 NetSci-X 2023 February 7–10, Buenos Aires, Argentina

Plenary Speakers

2020
School speakers
 Elsa Arcaute
 Ginestra Bianconi
 Petra Kralj Novak
 Jose F. Mendes
 Adilson Motter
 Filippo Radicchi

Invited speakers
 Réka Albert
 Stefano Boccaletti
 Lucilla de Arcangelis
 Diego Garlaschelli
 Gourab Ghoshal
 Kwang-Il Goh
 Joseph Loscalzo
 Miguel-Ángel Muñoz
 Mercedes Pascual
 Evimaria Terzi
 Francesca Tria
 Petra Vertes

Erdős–Rényi Prize
2020 Young Network Scientist Award
 TBA

Euler Prize 
2020 Network Scientist Award
 TBA

Service Price
2020 NetSci outstanding service award
 TBA

2019
School speakers
 Sidney Redner
 Peter Sheridan Dodds
 Vittoria Colizza
 Emma Towlson
 Daniel Larremore
 Puck Rombach

Keynote speakers
 Duncan Watts
 Tina Eliassi-Rad
 Michelle Girvan
 Mark Newman
 Paul Hines

Invited speakers
 Eleanor Power 
 C. Brandon Ogbunu
 Nicola Perra
 Hyejin Youn
 Emily Bernard (dinner speaker)

Erdős–Rényi Prize
2019 Young Network Scientist Award
 Tiago Peixoto

Euler Prize 
2019 Network Scientist Award
 Raissa D'Souza

Service Price
2019 NetSci outstanding service award
 Albert-Lászlo Barabási

2018
School speakers
 Javier M. Buldú
 Ciro Cattuto
 Emilio Ferrara
 Chiara Poletto

Keynote speakers
 Brenda McCowan 
 Mason Porter 
 Miriah Meyer 
 Rowland Kao 
 Filippo Menczer

Invited speakers
 Claudia Wagner
 Sam Scarpino
 Sonia Kéfi
 Brooke Foucault Welles
 Amy Wesolowski
 Stefano Battiston
 Sophie Achard
 Paolo Ciuccarelli (dinner speaker)

Erdős–Rényi Prize
2018 Young Network Scientist Award
 Danielle Bassett

2017
 Danielle Bassett (keynote)
 Stephen Borgatti (keynote)
 Jennifer Dunne (keynote)
 Cha Meeyoung
 Alex Fornito
 Lise Getoor 
 César A. Hidalgo 
 Shawndra Hill
 Maximilian Schich
 M. Ángeles Serrano
 Roberta Sinatra
 Xiaofan Wang

Erdős–Rényi Prize
2017 Young Network Scientist Award
 Vittoria Colizza

2016
 Albert-László Barabási
 Janos Kertesz
 Jeong Han Kim
 Olaf Sporns

Erdős–Rényi Prize
2016 Young Network Scientist Award
 Aaron Clauset

2015
 Edward Bullmore
 Raissa D'Souza
 Jordi García-Ojalvo
 Jürgen Kurths
 Tomás Saraceno (dinner speaker),
 Alessandro Vespignani

Erdős–Rényi Prize
2015 Young Network Scientist Award
 Chaoming Song

2014
 Reka Albert
 Sinan Aral
 Eric Berlow
 Vittoria Colizza
 Jessica Flack
 James P. Gleeson
 Dirk Helbing
 Michael Kearns
 Jon Kleinberg
 Cristopher Moore
 Saul Perlmutter (dinner speaker)
 Frank Schweitzer
 Thilo Gross
 Naoki Masuda
 Tina Eliassi-Rad

Erdős–Rényi Prize
2014 Young Network Scientist Award
 Mason Porter

2013
 Bernhard Palsson
 Kim Sneppen
 Mason Porter
 Shlomo Havlin
 Noshir Contractor
 Jennifer Neville
 Jure Leskovec
 Sue Moon
 Aaron Clauset
 Dirk Brockmann
 Matthew O. Jackson
 Jordi Bascompte
 Albert-László Barabási (school speaker)

Erdős–Rényi Prize
2013 Young Network Scientist Award
 Adilson E. Motter

2012
 Lada Adamic
 Stefano Allesina
 Luís Amaral (keynote)
 Duygu Balcan
 Albert-László Barabási (dinner speaker)
 Ronald S. Burt
 Iain Couzin (keynote)
 Jennifer Dunne
 J. Doyne Farmer (keynote)
 James Fowler (keynote)
 Neil Johnson
 Jon Kleinberg (keynote)
 Adilson E. Motter
 Michael W. Macy
 Sandy Pentland
 Marta Sales-Pardo

Erdős–Rényi Prize
2012 Young Network Scientist Award
 Roger Guimerà

2011
 Uri Alon
 Guanrong Chen
 Raissa D’Souza
 Robin Dunbar (dinner speaker)
 Marta C. González
 János Kertész
 László Lovász (keynote)
 Neo Martinez
 Gergely Palla
 Brian Uzzi
 Alessandro Vespignani
 Duncan Watts (keynote)

2010
 Uri Alon
 Sinan Aral
 James J. Collins (keynote)
 Ricardo Hausmann
 Stuart Kauffman (dinner speaker)
 Mark Newman (keynote)
 Sinan Aral
 Guido Caldarelli
 Jennifer Chayes
 Vittoria Colizza
 Riley Crane
 César A. Hidalgo
 Hawoong Jeong
 David Lazer
 Alan Mislove
 Yamir Moreno
 Jukka-Pekka Onnela
 Asuman Özdağlar
 Sandy Pentland
 Sidney Redner
 Olaf Sporns
 H. Eugene Stanley
 Balázs Vedres

2009
 Alessandro Vespignani
 Alain Barrat
 Ginestra Bianconi
 Dirk Brockmann
 Debora Donato
 Raissa D'Souza
 James Fowler
 Anne-Claude Gavin
 Kwang-Il Goh
 Shlomo Havlin
 Dirk Helbing
 Matthew O. Jackson
 János Kertész
 Amos Maritan
 José Fernando Mendes
 Joshua Lo Spinoso
 Luciano Pietronero
 Frank Schweitzer
 H. Eugene Stanley
 Bruce J. West

2008
 Albert-László Barabási
 Nicholas Christakis (keynote)
 Ian Gibson (honorary speaker)
 Robert May (keynote)
 Andre Watson (dinner speaker)
 Brian Uzzi (keynote)

2007
 Eivind Almaas
 Sinan Aral
 Katy Börner
 William Cheswick
 Aaron Clauset
 James J. Collins
 Pam DiBona
 Jennifer Dunne
 Marta C. Gonzales
 Natali Gulbahce
 César A. Hidalgo
 Peter A. Hook
 Ricardo Hausmann
 Weixia Huang
 Jon Kleinberg
 Joseph Loscalzo
 Mark Newman
 Stephen North
 Han Woo Park
 Dorion Sagan (dinner speaker)
 Chao Tang
 Stephen Uzzo
 Tamás Vicsek
 Chris H. Wiggins
 Muhammed Yildirim

Event structure
The NetSci conference generally starts with two days of satellite meetings organized by different people, and classes offering an introduction into different aspects of network science. The formal NetSci conference starts on Wednesday, and has a series of keynote speakers, invited speakers, and contributed talks in parallel sections.

Erdős–Rényi Prize
The Erdös-Rényi Prize in Network Science is awarded annually at the NetSci meeting,

References

Networks